Kashpi (local Quechua for stick (k'aspi), Hispanicized spelling Cashpe) is a mountain in the Andes of Peru, about  high. The mountain is located in the Junín Region, Yauli Province, Marcapomacocha District, and in the Lima Region, Huarochirí Province, Huanza District. It lies southeast of Chunta and northwest of a lake named Pukaqucha.

References

Mountains of Peru
Mountains of Lima Region
Mountains of Junín Region